"Wait Up" is a song by Australian pub rock band The Cockroaches. It was released in August 1986 as the lead single from the band's self-titled debut studio album. The song peaked at number 28 in Australia.

Track listing
7" single (K 72)'
Side A "Wait Up"
Side B "Henry's Lizard"

Charts

References

1986 singles
1986 songs
Mushroom Records singles
The Cockroaches songs